Cian Madden (born 29 October 1999) in an Irish Gaelic footballer who plays for Gowna and the Cavan county team.

Playing career

Club
Brady joined the Gowna club and later progressed to the club's senior team.

On 7 November 2021, Madden started his first county final as Gowna faced Ramor United. Madden scored 3 points in a low-scoring draw. Madden started the replay seven days later, and scored four frees but a strong start led Ramor to the title.

Gowna returned to the final the next year, where they faced Killygarry on October 16. Madden scored five points as Gowna claimed their first title in 20 years, and was also named man of the match.

Inter-county

Minor and under-20
On 16 July 2017, Madden was at centre forward as the Cavan minor team faced Derry in the Ulster final. Madden scored three points but Derry ran out seven-point winners. Madden scored 4 points against Connacht champions Galway as Cavan set up an All-Ireland semi-final against Kerry. On 20 August 2017, Madden scored one point as Cavan lost out to a David Clifford-inspired Kerry.

Madden also represented Cavan at under-20 level, but Cavan did not have any success at this time.

Senior
Madden joined the Cavan senior panel ahead of the 2022 season, and made his National League debut as a substitute in a win over Leitrim. Cavan faced Tipperary in the National League Division 4 final at Croke Park on 2 April 2022. Madden started the game and scored a point in the 2–10 to 0-15 victory.

On 23 April 2022, Madden made his championship debut, starting in the Ulster quarter-final win over Antrim. On 9 July 2022, Madden was at corner forward as Cavan took on Westmeath in the inaugural Tailteann Cup decider at Croke Park. Westmeath went home with the cup after a four-point win.

Honours
Cavan
 National Football League Division 4 (1): 2022

Gowna
 Cavan Senior Football Championship (1): 2022

References

1999 births
Living people
Cavan inter-county Gaelic footballers
Gowna Gaelic footballers